The Banganga is a river of northern India. It is an important tributary of the Chenab River. It flows through Katra, Jammu and Kashmir. The river originates from the southern slope of the Shivalik range of the Himalayas. It’s an important stop for Hindu devotees on the ‘’’Vaishno Devi’’’ pilgrimage, where many bathe before continuing their journey.

Etymology
The river's name comes from the roots ban "arrow" and ganga "river". Legend says that the mother ‘’’Vaishno Devi’’’ created the tributary with an arrow and bathed in it, washing her hair. This is why the river is also known as Bal Ganga, with bal meaning "hair" in Hindi.

Spiritual significance
The river has spiritual significance for Hindu Vaishnava and other devotees. Legend says that the mother Vaishno Devi, a goddess and devotee of Lord Rama, was heading toward her abode in Trikuta Hills when her accompaniment Hanuman felt thirsty. She shot an arrow in the ground and a river sprang from it. She bathed in it, washing her hair. This is why the river is also known as Bal Ganga, with "Bal" meaning "hair" in ‘’’Hindi’’’. More than 10 million visitors make the pilgrimage each year, and many bathe in the river to cleanse before they depart on the full journey.

References

Rivers of Himachal Pradesh
Rivers of India